Indian Standard Time (IST), sometimes also called India Standard Time, is the time zone observed throughout India, with a time offset of UTC+05:30. India does not observe daylight saving time or other seasonal adjustments. In military and aviation time, IST is designated E†. It is indicated as Asia/Kolkata in the IANA time zone database.

History

The Indian Standard Time was adopted on 1 January 1906 during the British India era with the phasing out of its precursor Madras Time (Railway Time), and after Independence in 1947, the Union government established IST as the official time for the whole country, although Kolkata and Mumbai retained their own local time (known as Calcutta Time and Bombay Time) until 1948 and 1955, respectively. The Central observatory was moved from Chennai to a location at Shankargarh Fort in Allahabad district, so that it would be as close to UTC+05:30 as possible.

Daylight Saving Time (DST) was used briefly during the China–India War of 1962 and the Indo-Pakistani Wars of 1965 and 1971.

Former timezones

Calculation

Indian Standard Time is calculated from the clock tower in Mirzapur nearly exactly on the reference longitude of IST at 82°30'E, within 4 angular minutes. In 1905, the meridian passing east of Allahabad was declared as a standard time zone for British India and was declared as IST in 1947 for the dominion of India. The longitude of 82°5'E passing through Naini near Prayagraj was chosen as the standard meridian for the whole country, because there is a time lag of more than an hour between western India (around +05:00) and northeastern India (around +06:00), hence approximately standardizing with UTC+05:30 of central India. Currently, the Council of Scientific and Industrial Research- National Physical Laboratory (CSIR-NPL) maintains the Indian Standard Time with the help of the Allahabad Observatory.

Criticism and proposals
The country's east–west distance of more than  covers over 29 degrees of longitude, resulting in the sun rising and setting almost two hours earlier on India's eastern border than in the Rann of Kutch in the far west. Inhabitants of the northeastern states have to advance their clocks with the early sunrise to avoid the extra consumption of energy after daylight hours.

In the late 1980s, a team of researchers proposed separating the country into two or three time zones to conserve energy. The binary system that they suggested involved a return to British-era time zones; the recommendations were not adopted.

In 2001, the government established a four-member committee under the Ministry of Science and Technology to examine the need for multiple time zones and daylight saving. The findings of the committee, which were presented to Parliament in 2004 by the Minister of Science and Technology, Kapil Sibal, did not recommend changes to the unified system, stating that "the prime meridian was chosen with reference to a central station, and that the expanse of the Indian State was not large."

Though the government has consistently refused to split the country into multiple time zones, provisions in labour laws such as the Plantations Labour Act, 1951 allow the Union and State governments to define and set the local time for a particular industrial area. In Assam, tea gardens follow a separate time zone, known as the Chaibagan or Bagan time ('Tea Garden Time'), which is one hour ahead of IST.  Still Indian Standard Time remains the only officially used time.

In 2014, Chief Minister of Assam Tarun Gogoi started campaigning for another time zone for Assam and other northeastern states of India. However, the proposal would need to be cleared by the union government.

In June 2017, Department of Science and Technology (DST) indicated that they are once again studying feasibility of two time zones for India. Proposals for creating an additional Eastern India Time (EIT at UTC+06:00), shifting default IST to UTC+05:00 and Daylight saving (Indian Daylight Time for IST and Eastern India Daylight Time for EIT) starting on 14 April (Ambedkar Jayanti) and ending on 2 October (Gandhi Jayanti) was submitted to DST for consideration.

Time signals
Official time signals are generated by the Time and Frequency Standards Laboratory at the National Physical Laboratory in New Delhi, for both commercial and official use. The signals are based on atomic clocks and are synchronised with the worldwide system of clocks that support the Coordinated Universal Time.

Features of the Time and Frequency Standards Laboratory include:
High frequency broadcast service operating at 10 MHz under call sign ATA to synchronise the user clock within a millisecond;
Indian National Satellite System satellite-based standard time and frequency broadcast service, which offers IST correct to ±10 microsecond and frequency calibration of up to ±10−10.
Time and frequency calibrations made with the help of pico- and nanoseconds time interval frequency counters and phase recorders.

IST is taken as the standard time as it passes through almost the centre of India. To communicate the exact time to the people, the exact time is broadcast over the national All India Radio and Doordarshan television network. Telephone companies have dedicated phone numbers connected to mirror time servers that also relay the precise time. Another increasingly popular means of obtaining the time is through Global Positioning System (GPS) receivers.

See also
Equation of time
International Atomic Time
John Goldingham
Railway time in India
Sri Lanka Standard Time
Terrestrial Time
Time in India
Time in Sri Lanka
Time zone (list)
UTC+05:30
Zoneinfo

References

External links
National Physical Laboratory
Evaluating two timezones[sic] and Daylight Saving Time for India, by Viral Shah & Vikram Aggarwal.

Time in India
Geography of India
Time zones